Philip Pendleton Cooke (October 26, 1816 – January 20, 1850) was an American lawyer and minor poet from Virginia.

Early and family life

Cooke was born on October 26, 1816, in Martinsburg when it was then part of Virginia to the former Maria Pendleton and her husband, planter and delegate John R. Cooke (1788-1854). He was thus descended from the First Families of Virginia. Of the large (13 child) family, his younger brother John Esten Cooke would become a minor novelist as well as lawyer, then a Confederate officer during the American Civil War while his cousin Philip St. George Cooke became a Union officer. Much earlier, the Cooke brothers received a private education appropriate to their class. Philip attended Princeton University, and graduated in 1834.

Career

Cooke spent the majority of his life in the northern part of the Shenandoah Valley. At Princeton, Cooke wrote the poems "Song of the Sioux Lovers," "Autumn," and "Historical Ballads, No. 6 Persian: Dhu Nowas," as well as a short story, "The Consumptive" before graduation.
Admitted to the Virginia bar, Cooke followed in his father's profession as a lawyer. His two main hobbies, however, were hunting and writing, though he never made a profession out of his writing. He once wrote: "I detest the law. On the other hand, I love the fever-fits of composition."
Cooke lived for a time at Saratoga, the former home of Daniel Morgan.

Death and legacy

Cooke died January 20, 1850.

Writings
Cooke believed his literary sustenance came from his library rather than from writing, despite several important literary figures — including John P. Kennedy and Rufus Wilmot Griswold — who encouraged him to write more. Edgar Allan Poe praised his work and wrote to him that he would "give your contributions a hearty welcome, and the choicest position in the magazine." By 1835, he resolved to give up on poetry entirely. He believed that poetry was as barren "as a worn-out tobacco field" and that even William Cullen Bryant, who he considered "the master of them all," had "sheltered himself from starvation behind the columns of a political newspaper" rather than making money from poetry. By 1847, the Southern Literary Messenger reported that Cooke had turned into a prose writer.

Cooke was well-read and his poetry was inspired by Edmund Spenser, Geoffrey Chaucer and Dante Aligheri. He also admired the prose work of Poe, which he told in a letter:

References

External links
 Philip Pendleton Cooke (1816–1850) at Encyclopedia Virginia
 Froissart Ballads: and Other Poems at the Internet Archive

1816 births
1850 deaths
19th-century American poets
American male poets
19th-century American male writers
Lawyers from Martinsburg, West Virginia
People from Millwood, Virginia
Poets from West Virginia
Poets from Virginia
Princeton University alumni
Virginia lawyers
19th-century American lawyers
Pendleton family
Cooke family of Virginia
People of pre-statehood West Virginia